Potoče is a village in the Municipality of Divača in the Littoral region of Slovenia.

The local church is dedicated to Saint George and belongs to the Parish of Senožeče.

References

External links

Potoče on Geopedia

Populated places in the Municipality of Divača